The Hatton Garden safe deposit burglary occurred in April 2015, when an underground safe deposit facility in Hatton Garden, London, owned by Hatton Garden Safe Deposit Ltd., was burgled. 

According to official sources, the total stolen had an estimated value of up to £14 million (equivalent to £ million in ), of which only £4.3 million (equivalent to £ million in ) has been recovered. The heist was planned and carried out by six elderly men who were experienced thieves, all of whom were arrested, pleaded guilty and received prison sentences in March 2016. Four other men were also tried on suspicion of involvement; three were found guilty and sent to prison, while the fourth was cleared.

Burglary

The burglars worked through the four-day weekend of the Easter Bank Holiday, when many of the nearby businesses (several of them also connected with Hatton Garden's jewellery trade) were closed. There was no externally visible sign of a forced entry to the premises.

The police first announced that the facility had been burgled on 7 April, and reports based on CCTV footage (released by the Daily Mirror before the police released it) state that the attack on the facility commenced on Thursday 2 April. The video showed people nicknamed by the newspaper as "Mr Ginger, Mr Strong, Mr Montana, The Gent, The Tall Man and The Old Man". On 22 April, the police released pictures of the inside of the vault showing damage caused by the burglary, and how the burglars had used holes drilled through the vault's wall to bypass the main vault door.

The theft was so significant that the investigation was assigned to the Flying Squad, a branch of the Specialist, Organised & Economic Crime Command within London's Metropolitan Police Service. On 8 April, press reports emerged speculating that a major underground fire in nearby Kingsway may have been started to create a diversion as part of the Hatton Garden burglary. The London Fire Brigade later stated that the fire had been caused by an electrical fault, with no sign of arson.

Timeline
 1 April 2015: Electrical cables under the pavement in Kingsway caught fire, leading to serious disruption in central London. The fire continued for the next two days, with flames shooting out of a manhole cover from a burst gas main, before being extinguished. Several thousand people were evacuated from nearby offices, however local residents were left without food and electricity, and several West End theatres cancelled performances. There was also substantial disruption to telecoms infrastructure.
 2 April, 21:19: depository staff locked doors for the Easter weekend
 2 April, 21:23: "Mr Ginger" descended to the vault, followed by three men pulling wheelie bins
 3 April, 00:21: Metropolitan Police were informed that the burglar alarm had been triggered
 3 April, 08:05: gang members talked before going to their van and driving away
 4 April, 21:17: "Mr Ginger" went down into the vault, and was later joined by two other men
 5 April, 06:10: the gang members drove away from the bank
 7 April: Scotland Yard expressed awareness that a burglary had taken place
 10 April: The Daily Mirror released CCTV footage
 19 May: The Metropolitan Police announced that they had arrested nine suspects
 1 September: Hatton Garden Safe Deposit Company went into liquidation
 28 March 2018: Another man was arrested

Arrests
On 19 May 2015, 76-year-old Brian Reader, who had previously been involved in laundering the proceeds of the Brink's-Mat robbery, was arrested in connection with the burglary by Flying Squad officers. In November 2015, Carl Wood, William Lincoln, Jon Harbinson and Hugh Doyle were all charged with conspiracy to commit burglary and conspiracy to conceal, convert or transfer criminal property. The theft was described as the "largest burglary in English legal history". Three years after the burglary, on 28 March 2018, Michael Seed, 57, was arrested after his home in Islington, London, had been searched. He was charged with conspiracy to burgle and conspiracy to conceal or disguise criminal property.

Sentencing

On 9 March 2016, at Woolwich Crown Court, three members of the gang, John "Kenny" Collins, Daniel Jones, and Terry Perkins, having pleaded guilty to conspiracy to commit burglary, were each given a seven-year prison term.

Carl Wood and William Lincoln were found guilty of the same offence and also one count of conspiracy to conceal, convert or transfer criminal property, after trial. Lincoln was also given a seven-year sentence, and Wood was sentenced to six years.

Hugh Doyle was found guilty of concealing, converting or transferring criminal property. He was jailed for 21 months, suspended for two years. Doyle was also fined £367.50 for his general criminal conduct in January 2018.

The alleged ringleader, Brian Reader, was sentenced to six years and three months in prison on 21 March 2016.

An eighth man, Jon Harbinson, was found not guilty and discharged.

In January 2018, a confiscation ruling at Woolwich Crown Court ruled that John "Kenny" Collins, Daniel Jones, Terry Perkins and Brian Reader must pay a total of £27.5 million or face another seven years in prison. Perkins died in prison in February 2018, just a week after the ruling. On 14 August 2018, Daniel Jones had his sentence extended by six years and 287 days for failing to return £6,599,021. On 1 August 2019, Collins was sentenced to an additional 2,309 days for failing to comply with the confiscation order. It was revealed during the hearing Collins had repaid £732,000 of the £7.6 million order. Enforcement action was said by the Crown Prosecution Service to be under way to seize Collins' remaining assets.

On 15 March 2019, Michael Seed was found guilty of burglary and conspiracy to burgle and was sentenced to 10 years in prison for the former and eight years for the latter, the two running concurrently. On 1 October 2020, Michael Seed was ordered to repay £6 million in damages or face an additional seven years in prison.

In television, film and radio
The burglary featured in episode five ("Heist!") of the American investigative science web-TV series White Rabbit Project, released on 9 December 2016. In the programme, presenters investigate and demonstrate the methods used in the heist and show dramatised re-enactments.

The burglary is the subject of three feature films: Hatton Garden: the Heist (2016), starring Sidney Livingstone and Michael McKell; The Hatton Garden Job (2017), with Larry Lamb and Phil Daniels; and King of Thieves (2018), starring Michael Caine, Tom Courtenay, Jim Broadbent, Michael Gambon, Paul Whitehouse and Ray Winstone. A four-part television serial, Hatton Garden, starring Kenneth Cranham and Timothy Spall, was aired on ITV in May 2019, after being delayed for 18 months due to legal developments.

The Hatton Garden Heist, a radio play by Philip Palmer, was broadcast on BBC Radio 4 in April 2017.

Some jewellers have claimed that the heist has actually helped their business due to increased publicity to the area.

See also
 1971 Baker Street robbery
 1977 Krugersdorp bank robbery
 2003 Antwerp diamond heist
 2005 Schiphol Airport diamond heist
 2013 Brussels Airport diamond heist
 List of heists in the United Kingdom
 List of missing treasures

References

Further reading
 A Swiss Bank & The Job in Spain.  Security boxes in Spain 10 years earlier
 same Hilti Drill: 
 Tom Pettifor, Nick Sommerlad, One Last Job: the Extraordinary Life of Brian Reader, Britain's Most Prolific Thief (Mirror Books, 2016)
 Wensley Clarkson, Sexy Beasts: the Inside Story of the Hatton Garden Heist (Quercus Editions, 2016)
 Nigel Cawthorne, The Great Diamond Heist – The Incredible True Story of the Hatton Garden Robbery (2016)

External links
 Hatton Garden burglary at met.police.uk
 The Hatton Garden Job at bbc.co.uk

2015 crimes in the United Kingdom
2015 in London
21st century in the London Borough of Camden
April 2015 crimes in Europe
April 2015 events in the United Kingdom
Burglaries in the United Kingdom
Crime in the London Borough of Camden
Holborn
Individual thefts
Subterranean London